Richard Rainey (December 5, 1938 – July 4, 2021) was an American politician from Walnut Creek, California, a suburb in the San Francisco Bay Area. He served in the California State Assembly from 1992 until 1996 and then served in the State Senate from 1996 until 2000 when he was defeated for reelection by Tom Torlakson, a Democratic Assemblyman from Antioch.  In 1995, Mr. Rainey was named Legislator of the Year by the California Probation & Parole Correctional Association.  Also, during the 1995–96 legislative session, Mr. Rainey served as Chairman of the Assembly Local Government Committee when the Republicans briefly had a majority in the State Assembly.

Background
Rainey was born in Medford, Oregon. He became a police officer in Compton, California in 1962. He was hired by the Contra Costa County Sheriff's department in 1964 and he was promoted through the ranks as a deputy sheriff, sergeant, lieutenant, and captain before he was elected County Sheriff in 1978. Mr. Rainey was appointed by Governor George Deukmejian during the 1980s to the State Board of Corrections and the Board of Trustees of the Robert Presley Institute of Corrections. He served until 1992 when he was elected to the Assembly to replace Bill Baker who was elected to Congress.

Rainey has a bachelor's degree in administration of justice from Sacramento State University (1973) and a master's degree in public administration from Golden Gate University (1976).

Rainey was married to Sue Rainey (née McNulty) and they resided in Walnut Creek. They have 7 adult children between them. Brett, Michael and Gina from Richard's 1st marriage to Micki DiLoreto  (Micki died from cancer 4/86) and Rob, Steve, Kathy and Kevin from Sue's 1st marriage.

He died of melanoma on July 4, 2021, in Walnut Creek, California, at age 82.

References

1938 births
2021 deaths
Republican Party California state senators
Republican Party members of the California State Assembly
California sheriffs
Politicians from Medford, Oregon
People from Compton, California
California State University, Sacramento alumni
People from Walnut Creek, California
Golden Gate University alumni